The Continental Tire Main Event is a 4 team college basketball tournament held during Monday and Wednesday of Thanksgiving week of NCAA Division I men's basketball season, with the inaugural tournament beginning in 2014. Games are held at the T-Mobile Arena beginning in 2017, with previous season being held at the MGM Grand Garden Arena. Starting in 2018, the Middleweight Bracket will be played at Cox Pavilion. Formerly known as the MGM Grand Main Event, Men Who Speak Up Main Event, and Roman Main Event, the tournament features two four-team brackets with each team playing two games in Las Vegas.  Opening round games are played on campus.

Brackets 
* – Denotes overtime period

2022

2021

2019

Heavyweight Bracket

Middleweight Bracket

*Games Played at Ed Clark High School

2018

Heavyweight Bracket

Middleweight Bracket 

Games Played at Cox Pavilion.

2017

Heavyweight Bracket

Middleweight Bracket

2016

Heavyweight Bracket

Middleweight Bracket

2015

Heavyweight Bracket

Middleweight Bracket

2014

Heavyweight Bracket

Middleweight Bracket
On October 6, 2014, the Middleweight Bracket was revised to a Round robin format.

Future Fields

2022
Baylor, UCLA, Virginia, Illinois

References

External links
 Roman Main Event

College men's basketball competitions in the United States
College basketball competitions
Recurring sporting events established in 2014
2014 establishments in Nevada
Basketball in Las Vegas
Events in Paradise, Nevada